Lambertville is an unincorporated community and census-designated place (CDP) in Monroe County in the U.S. state of Michigan.  The population was 10,433 at the 2020 census.  The CDP is located within Bedford Township.

The Lambertville 48144 ZIP Code serves the southwest part of Bedford Township and small portions of Whiteford Township to the west.

History
The community was settled as early as 1832 by John Lambert and was given a post office named West Erie on June 13, 1834 in the Michigan Territory.  It was so named due to its western location in Erie Township.  The post office was renamed Lambertville on January 15, 1836 when Bedford Township was established.  The post office closed briefly from March 25 to December 4, 1865 but has remained in continuous operation ever since.

Geography

Demographics

As of the census of 2000, there were 9,299 people, 3,315 households, and 2,665 families residing in the CDP. The racial makeup of the CDP was 97.89% White, 0.33% African American, 0.06% Native American, 0.57% Asian, 0.34% from other races, and 0.80% from two or more races. Hispanic or Latino of any race were 1.69% of the population.

There were 3,315 households, out of which 38.6% had children under the age of 18 living with them, 69.4% were married couples living together, 7.6% had a female householder with no husband present, and 19.6% were non-families. 16.0% of all households were made up of individuals, and 7.1% had someone living alone who was 65 years of age or older.  The average household size was 2.80 and the average family size was 3.15.

In the CDP the population was spread out, with 28.1% under the age of 18, 6.5% from 18 to 24, 29.1% from 25 to 44, 26.2% from 45 to 64, and 10.1% who were 65 years of age or older.  The median age was 38 years. For every 100 females there were 98.4 males.  For every 100 females age 18 and over, there were 97.4 males.

The median income for a household in the CDP was $62,221, and the median income for a family was $69,911. Males had a median income of $51,989 versus $34,973 for females. The per capita income for the CDP was $26,475.  About 3.2% of families and 4.8% of the population were below the poverty line, including 6.2% of those under age 18 and 7.1% of those age 65 or over.

Notable people
Leo Marentette, former professional baseball player and Lambertville resident at the time of his death.
Roy Parmelee, professional baseball player who was born in Lambertville

References

Census-designated places in Michigan
Census-designated places in Monroe County, Michigan
Unincorporated communities in Michigan
Unincorporated communities in Monroe County, Michigan
1832 establishments in Michigan Territory
Populated places established in 1832